Alfredo Yantorno (June 8, 1924 - July 28, 1963) was an Argentine swimmer who competed at the 1948 Summer Olympics and the 1952 Summer Olympics. He was the flag bearer for Argentina at the 1948 Summer Olympics during the opening ceremony, where he reached the final of the 400 m freestyle finishing 8th.

References

1924 births
1963 deaths
Olympic swimmers of Argentina
Swimmers at the 1948 Summer Olympics
Swimmers at the 1952 Summer Olympics
Argentine male freestyle swimmers